René Kieft (born 27 September 1946) is a retired Dutch rower. He competed at the 1972 Summer Olympics in the coxed pairs, together with Bernard Luttikhuizen and Herman Zaanen, but failed to reach the final.

References

1946 births
Living people
Dutch male rowers
Olympic rowers of the Netherlands
Rowers at the 1972 Summer Olympics
People from Andijk
Sportspeople from North Holland